Außenalster or Outer Alster Lake is the larger one of two artificial lakes, which are formed by the Alster River and are both located within the city limits of Hamburg, Germany. The other „lake“ is the Binnenalster. The Außenalster and its shores are used by the inhabitants of Hamburg for many sport and recreational purposes, such as sailing and rowing.

Overview

History 
The phrase "outer" refers to the former Wallanlagen (city walls) of Hamburg. The Außenalster was the part of the lake that was "outside" the city walls, built in 1625. In 1804 city wall and ramparts were stripped down and re-naturalized to parks, but the spatial division between the two lakes was retained. Today, two car and rail bridges, the Lombardsbrücke and the Kennedybrücke, span the river at this location. The areas around the Außenalster developed slightly different on the eastern and western sides; while the western side became a wealthy suburban area around the late 18th century, much of the eastern side used to be a property of the finance department of the City of Hamburg and only developed in the later decades of the 19th century.

Geography 
It is fed by the rivers Alster, Osterbek (via Osterbekkanal) and Wandse (via Mundsburger Kanal). Other canals entering the Außenalster include Rondeelkanal, Goldbekkanal and Uhlenhorster Kanal. The lake also forms a number of smaller bays and inlets. The Alster River enters the Außenalster in the North at Krugkoppelbrücke and leaves it in the South at Kennedybrücke.

Location 
Districts bordering the Außenalster are Harvestehude and Rotherbaum on the western shore, and Winterhude, Uhlenhorst, Hohenfelde and St. Georg on the eastern shore. Many of the streets around Außenalster are among the most desirable addresses in Hamburg. St. Georg, as part of Hamburg-Mitte, has a notably denser built environment; all other districts around Außenalster are primarily residential districts, with many of the villas around the lake also being used by various organizations or small professional businesses. Alsterufer and Harvestehuder Weg on the western shore include a number of consular missions, like the U.S. Consulate General. For its proximity to the inner city and its recreational qualities, the Außenalster is location of a number of hotels: among others, five-star superior Hotel Atlantic lies near the south-eastern bay of Außenalster; another hotel of the same category is currently under construction at Fontenay on the western shore.

Festivals, recreation and sport

Festivals 
Usually during May, the Japanese community in Hamburg organizes the annual Kirschblütenfest (Cherry Blossom Festival) around Außenalster. Less regularly − that is, only when a winter becomes cold enough and the Außenalster's ice strong enough − the Alstereisvergnügen is held on the frozen Alster.

Alsterpark 
Almost all banks of the Außenalster are public. Formerly private gardens on the western side were made public while Hamburg was host to the Internationale Gartenbauausstellung (International Horticulture Show, IGA) in 1953. The banks vary from a small strip of green to large public parks (e.g. the Alstervorland).

Water sports 

Because of frequently occurring gusts, the lake is considered no easy sailing area. The Alster's water is regularly tested for quality, and considered "very clean" by German standards. Nevertheless, swimming is not recommended, because of the density of watercraft and an oftentimes shallow vision. A number of famous, long-standing sailing and rowing clubs are based around Außenalster: like Der Hamburger und Germania Ruder Club (est. 1836), Ruderclub Allemannia (est. 1866), Norddeutscher Regatta Verein (est. 1868) or Hamburger Segel-Club (est. 1926).

See also 
 
 List of lakes in Schleswig-Holstein 
 List of lakes in Germany

Notes

References
 Statistical office Hamburg and Schleswig-Holstein Statistisches Amt für Hamburg und Schleswig-Holstein Statistisches Jahrbuch 2006/2007 (ISSN 1614-8045)

External links

 Photos of Außenalster on bilderbuch-hamburg.de 
 Photos of Außenalster on bilder-hamburg.info 
 

Lakes of Hamburg
Artificial lakes
Sports venues in Hamburg
Sailing in Germany
Tourist attractions in Hamburg

de:Alster#Außenalster